El Espinal may refer to:
El Espinal, Tolima, Colombia
El Espinal, Oaxaca, Mexico
El Espinal, Los Santos, Panama